The Euronova Media Group trust is a Moldovan group of media companies.

Overview 

Euronova Media group includes TV Euronova studio, Vocea Basarabiei radio station, TV Albasat in Nisporeni District, and TV Euronova in Ungheni District.

According to Valeriu Saharneanu, holding director, on the holding station were initiated criminal cases, before July 2009 election.

External links
 MASS MEDIA PERSPECTIVE 
 „Euronova Media Grup” waits for reactions from competent bodies
 Statement of the Euronova Media Grup 
 Appeal: Radio Station "Vocea Basarabiei" (Voice of Basarabia) and Television "Euronova Basarabia -1" of the holding Euronova Media Group.

References